"Stumble and Fall" is a song by English indie rock band Razorlight, included as the ninth track on their 2004 debut studio album, Up All Night. It was released as a single on 26 January 2004, reaching number 27 on the UK Singles Chart.

Track listings
UK CD1
 "Stumble and Fall"
 "For Georgia" (at the Hammersmith Working Mens Club)

UK CD2
 "Stumble and Fall"
 "Control"
 "Rip It Up" (Toerag demo)

UK 7-inch single
A. "Stumble and Fall"
B. "We All Get Up"

Charts

References

2004 singles
2004 songs
Razorlight songs
Songs written by Björn Ågren
Songs written by Johnny Borrell
Vertigo Records singles